Rudqat Rural District is in Sufian District of Shabestar County, East Azerbaijan province, Iran. At the National Census of 2006, its population was 11,837 in 2,939 households. There were 10,916 inhabitants in 3,150 households at the following census of 2011. At the most recent census of 2016, the population of the rural district was 11,158 in 3,482 households. The largest of its 20 villages was Ammand, with 1,664 people.

References 

Shabestar County

Rural Districts of East Azerbaijan Province

Populated places in East Azerbaijan Province

Populated places in Shabestar County